Ambassador Auditorium is located on the historic Ambassador College campus in Pasadena, California, United States. Its architectural design has been noted to be somewhat similar to that of the Temple in ancient Israel. The auditorium's main hall has a capacity of 1,262.

History 
Called by some concertgoers "The Carnegie Hall of the West", this relatively small yet beautiful concert hall hosted 20 seasons of the world's best musicians and performers from 1974 to 1995. Ambassador Auditorium is actually a large chamber music sized hall, with the design amenities of the finest large concert halls. It was built under the guidance of Herbert W. Armstrong as both a facility to be used by the Worldwide Church of God for church  services, college functions for the then adjacent Ambassador College, and as a concert hall for public performances celebrating the performing arts. At the time of its construction the building was furnished with Iranian onyx, African teak, wool carpets woven in India, and splendid gold-leaf overlay. It seats 1,262 persons. It was officially opened by the Vienna Symphony Orchestra.

It is estimated that 2.5 million attendees saw over 2,500 concerts at Ambassador Auditorium by Pavarotti, Plácido Domingo, Claudio Arrau, Vladimir Ashkenazy, Horacio Gutierrez, Alicia de Larrocha, Arthur Rubinstein, Andrés Segovia, Yo-Yo Ma, Jean-Pierre Rampal, Gerhard Oppitz, Bing Crosby, Sammy Davis Junior, Frank Sinatra, the Vienna Philharmonic, the Vienna Symphony Orchestra, the Berlin Philharmonic under Herbert von Karajan (including for their last visit together to the U.S. in 1982 - Mahler Symphony No. 9 on one program) and many others during this period.  With regard to classical music, the intimate feel of the venue was especially well suited to small ensembles, and soloists such as guitarists Julian Bream and John Williams.

Many artists were enticed to perform west of Chicago by reports of superior acoustics. It is one of the few concert halls constructed in the century with nearly perfect orchestral acoustics. (Opera was less successful at this venue due to insufficient behind the stage space and acoustics optimized for orchestral performance.) To illustrate the clarity of the acoustics, tour guides would drop a pin on the stage. The tour group, at the back of the hall, could hear it drop and the slight bounce when the pin hit the stage.

Arthur Rubenstein spoke glowingly of its acoustic qualities. For many years he refused to play on the West Coast due to earlier bad experiences with hall acoustics and pianos. To entice him out West to the Ambassador, he was allowed to select any grand piano of his choosing at Steinway Hall in New York. It was shipped out and tuned by Steinway. After Rubenstein's performance, a plaque was affixed naming it the Artur Rubenstein piano. Its reputation spread so quickly in musical circles, Herbert von Karajan changed his American tour with the Berlin Philharmonic shortly before leaving Berlin to play at the Ambassador. It was the only concert hall to which von Karajan would take the Berlin Philharmonic on the West Coast.

After 2,500 concerts and recitals, the Worldwide Church of God (WCG), which operated the college and auditorium, ceased operation of both in the 1990s and sold the property. Under Joseph W. Tkach Sr., the famous performing arts series was shut down in 1995, saying they could no longer afford to subsidize the program and that it was not central to the mission of the church. The WCG later relocated its operations to nearby Glendora.

On January 26, 1996, National Public Radio staged a battle of the bands between the contending cities in Super Bowl XXX. Pittsburgh's River City Brass Band played Semper Fidelis by John Philip Sousa and the Battle Royal March by Fred Jewell in concert at Ambassador Auditorium, followed by a performance from Dallas at the Meyerson Symphony Hall.

On May 14, 2004 the church announced the sale of approximately 13 acres (53,000 m²) of its former 31-acre (125,000 m²) campus to Harvest Rock Church (HRC) and Maranatha High School. The sale included the Ambassador Auditorium, now under the sole ownership of Che Ahn's HRock Church of Pasadena.  Since the acquisition of Ambassador Auditorium HRC    has re-opened the venue to the public. It hosts many regional ensembles including the Colburn Orchestra and the Pasadena Symphony.  HRock Church's services, conferences and special events are also held at the Auditorium along with Maranatha's.

From 2010-2019, the Ambassador Auditorium surroundings underwent massive change as the original Ambassador College campus was parceled up and sold to developers who tore down most other structures on the campus including the Fine Arts & Science Centers, Hall of Administration, & library in favor of apartment and condominium structures.

External links 
 Facebook Group about Ambassador Auditorium
 Pasadena Symphony and POPS
 www.theambassadorauditorium.org
 HRock Church
Ambassador Auditorium Collection (ARS.0043), Stanford Archive of Recorded Sound
The Doug Russell Collection of Ambassador Recitals (ARS.0054), Stanford Archive of Recorded Sound

References 

Concert halls in California
Buildings and structures in Pasadena, California
Former music venues in California
Music venues in Los Angeles
Tourist attractions in Pasadena, California